Rock Goes to College (RGTC) was a BBC series that ran between 1978 and 1981 on British television. A variety of up-coming rock oriented bands were showcased live from small venues and broadcast simultaneously on television and radio during a 40-50 minute live performance.

It was a follow-on to the mid-1960s BBC series Jazz Goes to College.

Concert venues
The venues were small university, polytechnic or college halls holding a few thousand people; often tickets were given to the Students' Union to distribute for free. The bands chosen were also, in some cases, bands which did not have a mainstream following at that time although many went on to be very successful.

A BBC DJ would also be present to introduce the band for the television audience.

Innovation
The original broadcasts were transmitted on television as well as Sight and Sound in Concert; a BBC initiative to provide simultaneous pictures on BBC2 and stereo radio broadcasts on BBC Radio 1, as stereo television broadcasts and receivers did not exist at the time. It allowed rock enthusiasts to enjoy the event with an improved sound quality.

Recordings
Original recordings of at least some of the Rock Goes to College series still exist and some legal releases have been made available, on DVD or CD, either as the concert in its entirety or as part of a compilation. UK Gold has re-broadcast some of the programmes (in stereo on television) in 2006 as has BBC Four and UK Arena in the late 1990s.

In some cases, the radio broadcasts contained additional songs to those broadcast via the television including pre-broadcast/warm-up tracks.

Concert listing
Many performances have been bootlegged from the original tapes or from public television/radio broadcasts. All references to availability on DVD here refers to legally produced and sold articles.

Episodes

Original Broadcasts 1978 (14 episodes)

The Boomtown Rats, 22 September, Middlesex Polytechnic, Hendon
Mary of the 4th Form
Introduction - Peter Drummond
Me & Howard Hughes
I Never Loved Eva Braun
Don't Believe What You Read
Rat Trap
Kicks
Joey's on the Street Again
Living on an Island
She's Gonna Do You In
Like Clockwork
She's So Modern
Looking After No. 1

Crawler, 29 September, University of London Union
The Crusaders, 10 October, Colchester Institute, Essex
The Stranglers. 20 October, University of Surrey, Guildford, Surrey
Ugly
I Feel Like a Wog
Bring on the Nubiles
Burning Up Time
Hanging Around
The concert is aborted when The Stranglers walk off stage, refusing to play to elitist audiences, after a dispute when an agreement to make tickets available outside of the college was not honoured.

Rich Kids, 27 October, University of Reading - with Midge Ure & Glen Matlock
Only Arsenic
Hung on You
Rich Kids
Burning sounds
Holy Holy
12 Miles High
Forever & Ever
Marching Men
Lovers & Fools
Strange One
Empty Words
Ghosts of Princes in Towers

The Climax Blues Band, 3 November, City of Birmingham Polytechnic.
John Martyn, 20 October. Available on DVD.
May You Never
One World
One Day Without You
The Dealer
Certain Surprise
Big Muff
Anna

AC/DC, 10 November, University of Essex, Colchester, Essex.
"Whole Lotta Rosie" available on the AC/DC compilation DVD Family Jewels. 
"Problem Child", "Sin City", "Bad Boy Boogie" available on the compilation DVD set Plug Me In. Introduced by Pete Drummond.
"Live Wire"
"Problem Child"
"Sin City"
"Bad Boy Boogie"
"Whole Lotta Rosie"
"Rocker"
"Let There Be Rock"

Lindisfarne, December, University of Essex, Colchester, Essex.
Court in the Act
Lady Eleanor
Winter Song
Make Me Want to Stay
Kings Cross Blues
Meet Me on the Corner
Run for Home	
Brand New Day	
We Can Swing Together

Cheap Trick
Hello There
Come On, Come On
Stiff Competition
Guitar Solo/Jam
Ain't That a Shame
Need Your Love
I Want You to Want Me
California Man
Surrender

Ian Dury & the Blockheads, Queen's University Belfast
Be-Bop Deluxe, Oxford
New Precision
Superenigmatix
Possession
Dangerous Stranger
Islands of the Dead
Lovers Are Mortal
Panic in the World

George Thorogood, Middlesex Polytechnic, Hendon
Ride on Josephine
Cocaine Blues
It Wasn't Me
I'm Just Your Good Thing
Madison Blues
New Hawaiian Boogie
Who Do You Love
No Particular Place to Go
Johnny B Goode

Tom Robinson Band

Original Broadcasts 1979 (8 episodes)

Bethnal, 6 January, University of London Union
The Cars, 13 January, University of Sussex, Brighton
Just What I Needed
Good Times Roll
I'm in Touch with Your World
My Best Friend's Girl
Moving in Stereo
All Mixed Up
Night Spots
Bye Bye Love
Don't Cha Stop
You're All I've Got Tonight

 The Rubinoos, 20 January, University of Reading

 Tonight 3:44
 I Think We're Alone Now 2:59
 Hard to Get 3:00
 I Never Thought It Would Happen 3:06
 I Wanna Be Your Boyfriend 3:40
 Hey Royse 2:19
 Promise Me 3:42
 Hold Me 3:14
 Fallin' in Love 2:08
 Arcade Queen 2:34
 Please Please Me1:51
 Walk Don't Run 2:23
 Rock 'n' Roll Is Dead 3:15

Rory Gallagher, 27 January, Middlesex Polytechnic
Shin Kicker
The Mississippi Sheiks
Do You Read Me
Brute Force & Ignorance
Fuel to the Fire
Shadow Play
Cruise on Out

The Police, 21 February, Hatfield Polytechnic
Can't Stand Losing You
So Lonely
Fall Out
Hole in My Life
Truth Hits Everybody
Message in a Bottle (first live performance and not released as a single)
Peanuts
Roxanne
Next to You

Steve Hillage, 28 February, University of Kent at Canterbury (broadcast 10 March)
Salmon Song
Unzipping the Zype
Hurdy Gurdy Man
1988 Aktivator
Unidentified (Flying Being)
It's All Too Much

Bruford, 17 March, Oxford Polytechnic, Oxfordshire (feat. Allan Holdsworth: guitar / Annette Peacock: vocals). Available on DVD.
Sample and Hold
Beelzebub
The Sahara of Snow (part one)
The Sahara of Snow (part two)
Forever until Sunday
Back to the Beginning
Adios a la Pasada (Goodbye to the Past)
5G

Average White Band, University of Surrey, Guildford
When Will You Be Mine
Atlantic Avenue
A Love of Your Own
I'm the One
Walk on By
Feel No Fret

Original Broadcasts 1980 (12 episodes)

Joe Jackson, 14 January, Hatfield Polytechnic
Look Sharp!
Baby Stick Around
Sunday Papers
One More Time
Friday
It's Different for Girls
Don't Wanna Be Like That
Happy Loving Couples
I'm the Man
Got the Time
Is She Really Going Out with Him?
Come On

The Specials, 21 January, Colchester Institute, Colchester, Essex
Do the Dog
Monkey Man
Rat Race
Blank Expression
Rude Boys Outta Jail
Doesn't Make it Alright
Concrete Jungle
Too Much Too Young
Guns of Navarone
Nite Klub
Gangsters
Longshot Kick de Bucket
Madness
You're Wondering Now

Live Wire, 4 February, Brighton Polytechnic
Secret Affair, 11 February, University of Bristol, Bristol
Spyro Gyra, 18 February, University of Leeds, Yorkshire (first ever UK performance)
Joe Ely Band, 20 February, Middlesex Polytechnic
Robin Trower, 25 February, University of London Union, London
Day of the Eagle
The Ring, Bridge of Sighs
Too Rolling Stoned
The Shout/Hannah
Daydream
Victims of the Fury
Little Bit of Sympathy

April Wine, 10 March, University of Reading
Tom Petty, 24 March, Oxford Polytechnic, Oxford
Shadow of a Doubt
Anything That's Rock 'n' Roll
Introduction - Peter Drummond
Even the Losers
Here Comes My Girl
I Need to Know
Luna
Stories We Could Tell
Refugee
Breakdown
American Girl

Steve Forbert, 31 March, Lancaster University
Going Down to Laurel
Romeo's Tune
Complications
Down by the Sally Gardens
What Kind a Guy
Steve Forbert's Midsummernight's Toast
Thinking
The Sweet Love That You Give Shure Goes a Long Long Way
Say Goodbye to Little Joe
You Can Not Win If You Do Not Play
Medley: Nadin, Pokeseller Danny, You Can Not Win If You Do Not Play

The Blues Band, 22 May, Keele University
After the Fire, 7 November, City University, London (broadcast 16 March 1981)
Sailing Ship (instrumental)
Wild West Show
Can You Face It?

Original Broadcasts 1981 (11 episodes)

Q-Tips, 12 January, Hatfield Polytechnic
UB40, 19 January, Keele University
King
Strange Fruit
The Earth Dies Screaming
Little by Little
I Think It's Going to Rain Today
Food for Thought
Tyler
Signing Off
The Motels, 26 January, University of Bradford
Kicks
Anticipating
Days Are O.K. (But the Nights Were Made for Love)
Closets & Bullets
Whose Problem?
Total Control
Party Professionals
Cry Baby
Envy
Danger
Conroy Guy
Wondering

John Martyn, 2 February, Chelsea School of Art
The Roches, 9 February, Loughborough University of Technology
Bad for Me
We
Nurds
The Troubles
My Sick Mind
Hallelujah Chorus
Hammond Song
Mr. Sellack

U2, 23 January, Queen's University Belfast
The Ocean
11 O’Clock Tick Tock
Cry - The Electric Co.
Out of Control
Gloria
I Fall Down

Stiff Little Fingers, 23 January, Queen's University Belfast
B. A. Robertson, 16 February, Preston Polytechnic, Lancashire
Gillan, 23 February, Oxford Polytechnic, Oxford. Available on DVD, "The Glory Years".
Unchain Your Brain
Mr Universe
No Easy Way
Trouble
Mutually Assured Destruction
On the Rocks
Vengenace
New Orleans

John Martyn. 2 March, University of Stirling. Available on DVD.
Big Muff
Some People Are Crazy
Grace and Danger
Save Some (For Me)
Eibhil Ghail Chiuin Ni Chearbhail
Couldn't Love You More
Amsterdam Rock
Johnny Too Bad

Siouxsie and The Banshees, 19 March, Warwick Arts Centre, University of Warwick, Warwickshire
Israel
Spellbound
Arabian Knights
Halloween
Christine
Night Shift
Red Light
But Not Them
Voodoo Dolly
Eve White/Eve Black

Bootlegs
In general, many of these performances will have only have been shown a very limited number of times on TV and in some cases only once. Very few of these concerts seem to have made it to legal DVD (such as the Bill Bruford, both John Martyn and a sample of AC/DC).

Bootlegs exist created from original TV (although very few domestic video recorders were around at the time) and radio broadcasts (through cassette tapes) as well as subsequent repeats. In particular, the AC/DC, Specials, Robin Trower, Ian Gillan, Cars, Police and U2 DVDs, CDs and tapes are commonly found advertised on trader's sites.

Some of the shows, such as AC/DC and The Police, have been recently broadcast on VH1 Classic on the show BBC Crown Jewels.

References

External links
 Rock Goes to College from the British Film Institute Film & TV Database
 Partial listing of RGTC concerts from whom.co.uk

Rock music television series
1978 British television series debuts
1981 British television series endings
1970s British music television series
1980s British music television series
BBC Television shows